Noriko T. Reider is the author of several books that focus on Japanese literature, folklore, and art. She currently works as a professor of Japanese at Miami University. She has written multiple books on the history of Japanese demons and yokai, with special focus on the history and nature of oni.

Books 

 Tales of the Supernatural in Early Modern Japan: Kaidan, Akinari, Ugetsu Monogatari (2002)

 Japanese Demon Lore: Oni from Ancient Times to the Present (2010)
 Seven Demon Stories from Medieval Japan (2016)

 Mountain Witches: Yamauba (2021)

Scholarly articles 

 Animating Objects Tsukumogami ki and the Medieval Illustration of Shingon Truth (2009)
 Japanese Demon Lore: Oni from ancient times to the present (2010)
 "Hanayo no hime," or "Blossom Princess" A Late-Medieval Japanese Stepdaughter Story and Provincial Customs (2011)
 Tsuchigumo soshi The Emergence of a Shape-Shifting Killer Female Spider (2013)
 Haseo sōshi: A Medieval Scholar’s Muse (2015)
 A Demon in the Sky The Tale of Amewakahiko, a Japanese Medieval Story (2015)

References 

Miami University faculty
Living people
Year of birth missing (living people)
Japanese folklorists
Japanese literature academics